Mastax royi is a species of beetle in the family Carabidae that can be found in Ivory Coast and Senegal.

References

Mastax royi
Beetles of Africa
Beetles described in 1969